Pittsburg is an unincorporated community in Columbia County, Oregon, United States. Pittsburg is located on the Nehalem River near its confluence with the East Fork Nehalem River. The Scappose-Vernonia road and the St. Helens-Pittsburg road join Oregon Route 47 near Pittsburg.

Pittsburg was named by early area resident Peter Brous, who settled there in 1879 and built a sawmill and a gristmill. Brous named the community for Pittsburgh, Pennsylvania, having formerly lived in that state. The Oregon post office was established with the name "Pittsburgh" on April 17, 1879, with Brous as the postmaster. The name was changed to "Pittsburg" in 1892 and the post office was discontinued in 1908.

References

External links
Pittsburg, Oregon history from VanNatta Forestry

Unincorporated communities in Columbia County, Oregon
1879 establishments in Oregon
Populated places established in 1879
Unincorporated communities in Oregon